This is a list of members of the Victorian Legislative Assembly, from the elections of 21 January; 7, 20 February 1868 to the elections of 14 February; 3, 16 March 1871. Victoria was a British self-governing colony in Australia at the time.

Note the "Term in Office" refers to that members term(s) in the Assembly, not necessarily for that electorate.

 Aspinall resigned c. October 1870, replaced by James Stephen in an October 1870 by-election.
 Baillie left parliament in November 1870, replaced by James Patterson in a December 1870 by-election.
 Balfour resigned August 1868, replaced by William Lobb in a September by-election
 Bindon resigned in October 1868, replaced by Richard Kitto in a by-election the same month.
 Byrne resigned October 1869, replaced by George Rolfe in a by-election the same month.
 Carr resigned May 1870, replaced by Robert de Bruce Johnstone in May 1870.
 Foott died 24 September 1868, replaced by Graham Berry in October 1868.
 Frazer died 13 December 1870, replaced by James Syme Stewart in January 1871.
 Gillies resigned in May 1868, replaced by Charles Jones  in a by-election the same month.
 Grant left Parliament in July 1870, replaced by Peter Finn who was sworn-in October 1870.
 McCaw resigned in September 1870, replaced by Robert Ramsay in October 1870.
 McCombie resigned in March 1869, replaced by George Macartney in a by-election the same month.
 McDonnell retired in April 1870, replaced by Michael O'Grady who was elected unopposed in July 1870.
 O'Grady became Minister for Public Works which caused a by-election in May 1868; won by John Branscombe Crews.
 Reeves lost a by-election in October 1869 after becoming a minister, replaced by William Vale.
 Vale resigned in April 1869, replaced by John James in a May 1869 by-election.
 Verdon resigned May 1868 replaced by John Whiteman in a June 1868 by-election

Francis Murphy was Speaker, Frederick Smyth was Chairman of Committees.

References

Members of the Parliament of Victoria by term
19th-century Australian politicians